Crazy as Pinoy is a Filipino hip hop group from Marikina, Philippines. Crazy as Pinoy was formed in the 1990s, and achieved mainstream success after the group became one of the finalists of Eat Bulaga!s rap battle segment, Rappublic of the Philippines. The lineup consisted of the members and their alter egos loosely based on José Rizal's novel, Noli Me Tángere. Crazy as Pinoy released their self-titled album in 2014, spawning songs such as "Tayo Pa Kaya" and their Awit Award-winning song, "Di Sinasadya". The group was also part of the two volumes of Rappublic of the Philippines with the songs "Crazy Dance", "Huwad" and "Panaginip". They have cited influences from the late Francis Magalona, with some of their work sounding slightly like Gloc-9, Chito Miranda of Parokya ni Edgar, Andrew E., Denmark, Mastaplann and numerous others.

Discography
 Crazy as Pinoy (2006)

References

Filipino rappers
Filipino hip hop groups
Musical groups from Metro Manila